The 2015 Volta Limburg Classic was the 42nd edition of the Volta Limburg Classic cycle race and was held on 4 April 2015. The race started and finished in Eijsden. The race was won by Stefan Küng.

Results

References

External links

2015
2015 in road cycling
2015 in Dutch sport